Ithamar Challita Romanos (born 10 May 1999) is a Lebanese footballer who plays as a defender for Lebanese club EFP.

Club career 
Romanos first began playing football at youth level at Athletico, aged 11. In 2015, aged 14, she joined Girls Football Academy (GFA), and made her debut in the Lebanese Women's Football League. Romanos played at under-17, under-19 and senior levels for GFA and ÓBerytus, her following club, before joining Eleven Football Pro (EFP) in 2019.

International career 
Romanos first represented Lebanon internationally at under-17 level at the 2015 Arab U-17 Women's Cup, which Lebanon won. She made her senior-team debut in 2019, playing at the 2020 AFC Women's Olympic Qualifying Tournament and the 2019 WAFF Women's Championship.

Honours
Lebanon U17
 Arab U-17 Women's Cup: 2015

Lebanon
 WAFF Women's Championship third place: 2019

See also
 List of Lebanon women's international footballers

References

External links

 

1999 births
Living people
People from Matn District
Lebanese women's footballers
Women's association football defenders
Athletico SC players
Girls Football Academy players
ÓBerytus players
Eleven Football Pro players
Lebanese Women's Football League players
Lebanon women's youth international footballers
Lebanon women's international footballers